Oscar Goines (July 4, 1893 – death date unknown) was an American Negro league third baseman in the 1910s.

A native of Seattle, Washington, Goines played for the West Baden Sprudels and the Louisville White Sox in 1915, and went on to play for the Jewell's ABCs club in 1917. In eight recorded games, he posted six hits in 33 plate appearances.

References

External links
Baseball statistics and player information from Baseball-Reference Black Baseball Stats and Seamheads

1893 births
Year of death missing
Place of death missing
Louisville White Sox players
West Baden Sprudels players